The Vietnam Veterans is a French psychedelic band, hailing originally from Chalon-sur-Saône, a commune in eastern France. They released six full-length albums during the 1980s, starting in 1983. The band was praised by many alternative music publications, including Bucketfull of Brains during the 1980s. After a 21-year-long pause, they are now active again.

History
After releasing their compilation album The Days of Pearly Spencer in 1988, they broke up, and some members moved on to other projects. In 2005 The Vietnam Veterans released a single called "I Give You My Life / Children Eyes", and in 2009 a full-length album called Strange Girl (As The Gitanes). The band The Gitanes was one of the projects a few of the former Vets had, and the name is now added to The Vietnam Veterans name, calling it "The Vietnam Veterans (a.k.a. The Gitanes)".

Members

Current members
Mark Enbatta – lead vocals, guitar (1983–1988, 2009–present)
Lucas Trouble – keyboards (1983–1988, 2009–present)
James Kibut – (2009–present)
Eric Lenoir – (2009–present)

Discography

Studio albums

Live album

Compilation albums

Single

References

External links
Music Maniac Records
Official The Vietnam Veterans MySpace page
Rate Your Music (Discography, reviews etc.)

Musical groups from Bourgogne-Franche-Comté
French psychedelic rock music groups
Musical groups established in 1982
1982 establishments in France
French garage rock groups